Lakhmino is a rural locality (a village) in Kubenskoye Rural Settlement, Vologodsky District, Vologda Oblast, Russia. The population was 49 as of 2002.

Geography 
Lakhmino is located 36 km northwest of Vologda (the district's administrative centre) by road. Obrosovo is the nearest rural locality.

References 

Rural localities in Vologodsky District